Shurjeh (also Romanized as Shūrjeh; also known as Shūrcheh and Sūrjeh) is a village in Zirkuh Rural District, Bagh-e Bahadoran District, Lenjan County, Isfahan Province, Iran. At the 2006 census, its population was 71, in 17 families.

References 

Populated places in Lenjan County